The CONCACAF–AFC play-off of the 2003 FIFA Women's World Cup qualification competition was a two-legged home-and-away tie that decided one spot in the final tournament in the United States. The play-off was contested by the third-placed team from CONCACAF, Mexico, and the fourth-placed team from the AFC, Japan.

Qualified teams

Summary
The draw for the order of legs was held at the FIFA headquarters in Zürich, Switzerland on 4 March 2003. The matches were originally scheduled to take place on 10 and 17 May 2003. However, due to the postponement of the 2003 FIFA Women's World Cup, the matches instead took place on 5 and 12 July 2003.

|}

Matches

Japan won 4–2 on aggregate and qualified for the 2003 FIFA Women's World Cup.

Goalscorers

References

External links
FIFA website 
Japanese match report

Play-off
Mexico women's national football team matches
Japan women's national football team matches
July 2003 sports events in North America
July 2003 sports events in Asia
2003–04 in Mexican football
2003 in Japanese women's football
2003
2003